Don Youngblood (April 7, 1954 – May 8, 2005) was an American IFBB professional bodybuilder.

Stats
Height: 5'9''
Off Season Weight: 295 lb.
Competition Weight: 245 lb.

Early life

Youngblood started his trucking career in the mid-1970s as a driver for the Southern Pacific Railroad in Bakersfield, California. “After a year, I was able to convince the bank to loan me the money for an old Peterbilt truck. After I paid off the loan, I bought a new truck, and then had a business opportunity in Arkansas.” In Alma, Arkansas, he founded SDS Transportation Services which later had 100 trucks hauling frozen foods all over the county for companies like Wal-Mart, Tyson and Cargill.

Bodybuilding
In 1987, after 13 years of business building, Youngblood decided to train seriously: “Bodybuilding was something I always wanted to do and I started by first working out in my garage. My inspiration was Vince Taylor who already had about a half-dozen titles to his credit when I was just getting started. I never dreamed I would be competing head to head with the guy in just a few years. I went to a couple of bodybuilding shows and realized that I had the size and the willpower to be a serious competitor.” In 1994 Youngblood took 1st in the Arkansas State Masters competition, and in 1995 became the Arkansas Overall State Champion at age 41. Within three months, he won the overall title at the NPC Masters Nationals. When the Masters Nationals winner was later granted a pro qualification, Youngblood received a pro card retrospectively. He was now qualified for the Joe Weider IFBB Masters Olympia contest, which had been dominated by Vince Taylor for several years. Youngblood took 2nd place at the 2001 contest, which Taylor won. In 2002, in Lynchburg, Virginia, he won the Masters Olympia, dethroning Taylor as the pro masters  champ.

1994 NPC Arkansas State Masters - 1st (overall winner)
1995 NPC Arkansas State Overall - 1st (overall winner)
1995 NPC Masters Nationals, Heavyweight, 1st (overall winner)
2001 IFBB Masters Olympia, 2nd
2002 IFBB Masters Olympia, 1st (overall winner) 
2002 IFBB Olympia, 25th

Death
Youngblood died in his home in Alma on May 8, 2005, of a massive heart attack.

See also
List of male professional bodybuilders
List of female professional bodybuilders

External links
Official website
Article on Bodybuilders.com
Bodybuilder Don Youngblood Tribute
Don Youngblood Biography

References

 Bodybuilder Don Youngblood. (n.d.). Retrieved from http://www.criticalbench.com/Don-Youngblood.htm
 Masters Olympia Champ R.I.P. (2005, May 11). Retrieved from https://www.bodybuilding.com/fun/youngbloodrip.htm
 Sunny, B. (n.d.). Don Youngblood Biography,Photos and Profile. Retrieved from http://muscleshunk.blogspot.com/2012/05/don-youngblood-biographyphotos-and.html

Professional bodybuilders
1954 births
2005 deaths
Sportspeople from Arkansas